1958–59 WIHL season was the 13th season of the Western International Hockey League.

Standings
 Nelson Maple Leafs 21–17–2–44	171–154
 Rossland Warriors	19–19–2–40	178–173
 Trail Smoke Eaters 17–21–2–36	144–166

Playoffs

Semi final (Round-robin tournament)
 Rossland 6 Nelson 2
 Nelson 3 Trail 2
 Rossland 5 Trail 2
 Nelson 2 Rossland 1
 Nelson 4 Trail 3
 Rossland 8 Trail 4
 Trail 4 Rossland 3
 Trail 5 Nelson 4
 Rossland 4 Trail 3
 Nelson 6 Rossland 3
 Trail 4 Nelson 0
 Nelson 6 Rossland 2
 Nelson Maple Leafs 5–3–0–10 27–26
 Rossland Warriors	4–4–0–8	33–29
 Trail Smoke Eaters 3–5–0–6 27–32

Final (Best of 5)
 Nelson 9 Rossland 4
 Nelson 5 Rossland 4
 Nelson 4 Rossland 1

The Nelson Maple Leafs beat Rossland Warriors 3 wins to none.
The Nelson Maple Leafs advanced to the 1958–59 British Columbia Senior Playoffs.

References

External links 
 Spokane Daily Chronicle, 10 May 1958
 The Spokesman-Review, 25 June 1958
 The Spokesman-Review, 29 June 1958
 Spokane Daily Chronicle, 7 July 1958
 Ellensburg Daily Record, 28 July 1958
 Tri City Herald, 25 August 1958
 Spokane Daily Chronicle, 27 August 1958
 Spokane Daily Chronicle, 14 October 1958
 Spokane Daily Chronicle, 16 October 1958
 The Spokesman-Review, 26 December 1958
 Spokane Daily Chronicle, 27 February 1959

Western International Hockey League seasons
Wihl
Wihl